The 1999 Grand Prix de Tennis de Toulouse was a men's tennis tournament played on Indoor Hard in Toulouse, France that was part of the World Series of the 1999 ATP Tour. It was the eighteenth edition of the tournament and was held from 27 September – 3 October.

Seeds
Champion seeds are indicated in bold text while text in italics indicates the round in which those seeds were eliminated.

Draw

Finals

Top half

Bottom half

References

1999 ATP Tour
1999 Singles
1999 in French tennis